Moab is the historical name for an ancient kingdom whose former territory is located in modern-day Jordan.

Moab or MOAB may also refer to:

Places
 Moab, Utah, a United States city
 Newman Lake, Washington, an unincorporated community alternatively known as Moab

Arts and entertainment
 "Moab", a song by Conor Oberst from Conor Oberst
 Moab, a fictional planet in the comic strip The Ballad of Halo Jones
 MOAB, an enemy in the tower defense game series Bloons Tower Defense

Science and technology
 GBU-43/B MOAB (Massive Ordnance Air Blast), or Mother Of All Bombs
 Moab Cluster Suite, a cluster workload management package
 Monoclonal antibody (MoAb), identical antibodies produced by offspring of a single parent cell
 Novell "Moab", codename for Novell NetWare 5.0
 Month of Apple Bugs (MoAB), a month of bugs computer security strategy

Other uses
 Moab, the first son of Lot and patriarch of the kingdom of Moab, mentioned in the Hebrew Bible
 Mother of all battles

See also
 Moabite (disambiguation)